Muqrin ibn Zamil ( Migrin ibin Zāmil) was the Jabrid ruler of eastern Arabia, including al-Hasa, al-Qatif, and Bahrain, and the last Jabrid ruler of Bahrain and Eastern Arabia.  He was defeated in battle by an invading Portuguese force that conquered the islands of Bahrain in 1521. Having been captured in battle, King Muqrin died from his wounds several days later. The Portuguese commander, António Correia, later depicted King Muqrin's decapitated bleeding head on his family's coat of arms in Lousã. 

Muqrin ascended to power following the death of the Jabrid's most powerful ruler, Ajwad ibn Zamil, who was possibly Muqrin's grandfather.  Muqrin was one of three Jabrid brothers who between them ruled the Jabrid kingdom composed of Oman, the north coast of Oman, and the Bahrain-Qatif area; Muqrin ruled the latter area from his capital in al-Hasa. He refused to pay tribute to the expanding Portuguese-Hormuzi alliance that had come to dominate the sea lanes, prompting the two allies to send an invasion force to subdue the Jabrid kingdom of Bahrain.

The English 19th Century traveller, James Silk Buckingham's account of the invasion was particularly critical of the "disgraceful" treatment of Muqrin's body:

The severed head remains a feature of the coat of arms of the Count of Lousã, Correia's descendant in Portugal.

The defeat of Muqrin began nearly eighty years of Portuguese rule of Bahrain.

References

1521 deaths
16th-century Arabs
Jabrids
Year of birth unknown